Święty Wojciech (formerly ) is a village in the administrative district of Gmina Międzyrzecz, within Międzyrzecz County, Lubusz Voivodeship, in western Poland.

The village has a population of 200.

It was probably the death place of Saint Five Martyred Brothers in the early 11th century.

References

Villages in Międzyrzecz County
11th century in Poland